Gate Studios was one of the many studios known collectively as Elstree Studios in the town of Borehamwood, England. Opened in 1928, the studios were in use until the early 1950s. The studios had previously been known as Whitehall Studios, Consolidated Studios, J.H. Studios and M.P. Studios.

History
A single large stage was built in Station Road, Borehamwood, in 1928 by Whitehall Films Ltd, but the company was dissolved in 1930, and its studio sold to Audible Filmcraft, who, in turn, crashed in August 1932. Consolidated Film Studios took over the lease in November 1933, then Independent Producers Studios acquired the studio in July 1935. In November 1935, Julius Hagen, the owner of Twickenham Studios, bought the site and formed a new company, J.H. Studios. Financial problems forced Hagen to sell the studios to M.P. Productions in 1937. The studios were acquired by the Anglo-American Film Corporation in September 1938. During World War II, the studio was used by the government for storage.

In 1950, the site was bought by J. Arthur Rank, who renamed it Gate Studios and made religious films. The last film produced was John Wesley in 1954, and the site was sold to Andrew Harkness, a manufacturer of cinema screens.  Harkness Screens moved out of the site in 2004 having established a global manufacturing base in France and the US and relocated its UK operation to a new production facility in Stevenage. The building in Borehamwood was demolished in 2006 to make way for 133 new properties, the development being named Gate Studios in homage to the former site.

Films shot at the studios

Whitehall Studios
The following films were shot at Whitehall Studios.

J.H. Studios
The following films were shot at J.H. Studios.

M.P. Studios
The following films were shot at M.P. Studios.

Gate Studios
The following films were shot at Gate Studios.

See also
 :Category:Films shot at Station Road Studios, Elstree
 Lists of productions shot at the other Elstree studios:
 List of films and television shows shot at Elstree Studios
 List of films and television shows shot at Clarendon Road Studios
 
 List of films shot at MGM-British Studios, Elstree

References

External links
Elstree Screen Heritage, "Creating a record of The Gate Studios"
"Remembering the Gate Studios" DVD, at Elstree Screen Heritage 
 "The Gate Studios" at the Elstree and Boreham Wood Museum website

British film studios
Film production companies of the United Kingdom
Borehamwood
Demolished buildings and structures in England
Buildings and structures demolished in 2006
Buildings and structures in Hertfordshire
History of Hertfordshire